Camp de Morvedre is a comarca in the province of Valencia, Valencian Community, Spain.

Municipalities 

Albalat dels Tarongers
Alfara de Algimia
Algar de Palancia
Algímia d'Alfara
Benavites
Benifairó de les Valls
Canet d'En Berenguer
Estivella
Faura
Gilet
Petrés
Quart de les Valls
Quartell
Sagunto
Segart
Torres Torres

 
Comarques of the Valencian Community
Geography of the Province of Valencia